Guyana competed at the 1968 Summer Olympics in Mexico City, Mexico.  The Games were hosted from October 13 through October 20, with 1,028 participants (785 men and 243 women) representing 92 countries.

They fielded five competitors, all men.

Results by event

Athletics
Men's marathon
 Harry Prowell — 2:57.01.4 hrs (→ 50th place)

Boxing
Bantamweight (54 kg)
 Dhanraj Singh
 Round 2 - Lost to Samuel Mbugua of Kenya

Middleweight (75 kg)
 Charles Amos
 Round of 16 - Lost to Wiesław Rudkowski of Poland

Cycling
1000 metres time trial
 Aubrey Bryce — 1:12.73 min (→ 31st place)

Sprint
 Aubrey Bryce
 Round 1 — 3rd place in heat (→ advanced to repechage)
 Repechage — 3rd place in heat (→ did not advance)

Weightlifting
Light heavyweight (82.5 kg)
 Rudolph James
 Press — 120.0
 Snatch — 127.5
 Snatch — 165.0
 Total — 412.5 (→ 19th place)

References

Official Olympic Reports
Part Three: Results

Nations at the 1968 Summer Olympics
1968 Summer Olympics
1968 in Guyana